Alexandria station is a historic train station in Alexandria, Minnesota. It was listed on the National Register of Historic Places in 1985 as the Great Northern Passenger Depot.

The Saint Paul and Pacific Railroad reached Alexandria in 1878.  The Great Northern Railway promoted Alexandria as a tourist destination, with brochures and attractive fares, and the growing tourist traffic made it necessary to replace the original wood-frame depot.

The new depot was built more ornately than the usual depots, which were executed from standardized plans developed by the railroads.  The Alexandria depot had mosaic tile floors, birch woodwork, enameled brick wainscoting, and comfortable furniture, and it was located conveniently next to a nearby park.  The new depot was one of the largest and most ornate along the Great Northern line in Minnesota.

The Alexandria depot was an active passenger station until May 1, 1971.  The depot's last train; Burlington Northern's " Western Star " was not continued by Amtrak & made its last run on April 30, 1971.  Freight service continued until 1976, at which point the depot was shuttered.  Burlington Northern sold the building in 1984, and its new owners completed a restoration and reopened it the next year as the Depot Express Restaurant and Lounge.  The adjacent rail line is now the Central Lakes State Trail.

References

External links
 Depot Express – current tenant

Buildings and structures in Douglas County, Minnesota
Former Great Northern Railway (U.S.) stations
Railway stations on the National Register of Historic Places in Minnesota
Railway stations in the United States opened in 1907
National Register of Historic Places in Douglas County, Minnesota
Former railway stations in Minnesota